The Padma Bridge graft scandal was a political scandal in Bangladesh in 2016 and 2017, involving the Bangladesh Awami League and the Padma Bridge, a  road—rail bridge across the Padma River and Bangladesh's largest bridge.

The World Bank were to have financed the project with ৳11,367 crore (US$1.2 billion) of credit, but they pulled out citing corruption concerns, specifically that Canadian construction company SNC-Lavalin had bribed a Bangladeshi official in exchange for a construction contract.

Two SNC-Lavalin executives were charged in Canada, but after the court excluded wiretap evidence the prosecution withdrew and the court dismissed the case.

World Bank personal statement
The World Bank has published a detailed statement about their allegation of corruption relating to the Padma Bridge and their subsequent pullout from the financing of the project. They have also published a FAQ ("Frequently Asked Questions" document) in order to better explain their position and activities.

The World Bank alleged that there had been a "conspiracy" plotted to stage a high-level corruption in the project:

The World Bank has credible evidence corroborated by a variety of sources which points to a high-level corruption conspiracy among Bangladeshi government officials, SNC Lavalin executives, and private individuals in connection with the Padma Multipurpose Bridge Project.

They have provided the Bangladeshi government with evidence of the corruption plot and stated that they couldn't advance forward with the loan if no action was taken:

To be willing to go forward with the alternative turnkey-style approach, they sought the following actions: (i) place all public officials suspected of involvement in the corruption scheme on leave from Government employment until the investigation is completed; (ii) appoint a special inquiry team within the ACC to handle the investigation, and (iii) agree to provide full and adequate access to all investigative information to a panel appointed by the World Bank composed of internationally recognized experts so that the panel can give guidance to the lenders on the progress, adequacy, and fairness of the investigation.  We worked extensively with the Government and the ACC to ensure that all actions requested were fully aligned with Bangladeshi laws and procedures.

They also said that they sent a delegation to the Government of Bangladesh to seek an explanation from them, but the explanation from the Bangladeshi side was unsatisfactory:

... we sent a high-level team to Dhaka to fully explain the Bank’s position and receive the Government’s response. The response has been unsatisfactory at the time.

Investigation

Canadian court
SNC-Lavalin official Ramesh Saha's diary had a list of Bangladeshi citizens who were to receive 10–12% commission for awarding the Padma Bridge contract to SNC-Lavalin. According to her diary: "Padma PCC, 4% Min, 2% Kaiser, 2% Nixon, 1% Secretary and 1% Moshi Rahman." According to the documents, "Min" referred to former communication minister Syed Abul Hossain; "Kaiser" is former state minister for foreign affairs Abul Hasan Chowdhury; "Nixon" is the prime minister's nephew Mujibur Rahman; "Secretary" is former Bridges Division secretary Mosharraf Hossain Bhuiyan; and "Moshi Rahman" is the prime minister's economic affairs adviser Mashiur Rahman. Another 2% was kept for someone, but the name was not available.

CBC TV
CBC TV of Canada performed investigative journalism, and they speculated that there was a wide-ranged plot of corruption in the project.

Aftermath
The World Bank blacklisted the Canadian firm, SNC-Lavalin Inc, and banned it from any business for 10 years due to the firm's alleged involvement in Padma Bridge project corruption scandal. Since the World Bank withdrew its involvement, the estimated cost of the bridge has climbed by over US$3 billion and the expected completion date is being pushed back by four years to 2022. On 24 January 2017, in her speech in the parliament, Prime Minister Sheikh Hasina blamed Muhammad Yunus for the World Bank's pulling out of the project. According to her, Yunus lobbied with the former US Secretary of State Hillary Clinton to persuade the World Bank to terminate the loan. The bridge has been completed and inaugurated in 2022 in Bangladesh with its own resources.

Dismissal of charges by a Canadian court and Bangladesh ACC
In 2015, Bangladesh's Anti-Corruption Commission (ACC) investigated the case after the World Bank continuously pushed the government to take action against the alleged perpetrators. After 53 days of investigation, ACC found nobody to be guilty. On the basis of ACC's report, Dhaka district judge court acquitted all the seven government officials who were alleged to have been involved in the corruption plot. Before that, the ACC exonerated Syed Abul Hossain and ex-state minister for foreign affairs Abul Hasan Chowdhury from the allegation of involvement in the corruption conspiracy.

On February 11, 2017, a Canadian court acquitted ex-SNC-Lavalin executives, dismissing the case. The wire tap evidence was ruled inadmissible.

References

2016 in Bangladesh
2017 in Bangladesh
2016 in Canada
2017 in Canada
Political scandals in Bangladesh
Political scandals in Canada
Padma Bridge
Corruption in Bangladesh
Bangladesh–Canada relations